The Château de Virieu is a castle in Pélussin, Loire, Rhône-Alpes, France.

History
It was built in 1633 on the site of a previous castle built as early as 1173.

Architectural significance
It has been listed as an official historical monument by the French Ministry of Culture since 2001.

References

Châteaux in Loire (department)
Monuments historiques of Loire (department)